Svetislav Jovanović (15 March 1861 – 1933) was a Serbian Realist painter.

Biography
He was born on March 15, 1861, in Vršac. He was the brother of the famous Serbian painter Paja Jovanović and Milan Jovanović, the most famous Serbian photographer of the 19th century. He finished high school in Vienna, where he began his studies in painting. He continued his studies in 1879 in Petrograd, Munich (with his brother Paja Jovanović) and Paris at the Zillian Academy. He spent most of his life in Paris, where he lived for fifty years.

He was especially esteemed in Paris, where he lived and was gladly accepted into the highest circles of France. One of his closest friends was the son of the President of the French Republic, Sadik Karno. Svetislav Jovanović was decorated in 1928 with the French Order of the Legion of Honor, and the Kingdom of Serbia awarded him the highest rank: the Order of the White Eagle and the Order of Saint Sava. Svetislav Jovanović made a self-portrait of himself in a fencing suit with a brush in his hands.

Namely, he was not only an artist but also a swimmer, rider and swordsman with worldwide fame at the time. In Paris, Svetislav won the highest championship titles in 1904 and 1907 as a swordsman. About this, Gaston Renar, Jovanović's biographer, who places him among the world's most celebrated swordsmen, writes: "Hundreds of the defeated dropped their weapons under Jovanović's blows." swordsmen of the world such as Boda, Lana, Busea. That all this was not an exaggeration can be seen from the fact that Jovanović was the president of the largest and most powerful fencing club in France - the "Paris Fencing Club", which brought together personalities from the highest circles of France. Jovanović was elected to the post as a foreign citizen, although the rules explicitly stipulated that the president could only be French. Jovanović died in Paris in 1933 and was buried in the Perlausez Cemetery, where the site is only for the most respected.

Works
Prelje (-1899)
Polazak u lov (1899)
Ašikovanje (1901)
Albanac (1905)
Orijentalka (1905–10)
Mlada crnogorka (1910)
Autoportret (1921)

Gallery

See also
 List of Orientalist artists
 Orientalism
 Serbian art
 List of painters from Serbia

References

Sources

External links

20th-century Serbian people
Serbian painters
People from the Kingdom of Serbia
People of the Kingdom of Yugoslavia
1861 births
1933 deaths
Realist painters
Orientalist painters
20th-century painters